Danilo Santarsiero (born March 30, 1979) is an Italian bobsledder who has competed since 2004. His best Bobsleigh World Cup finish was third in the two-man event at Lake Placid in December 2006.

Santarsiero's best finish at the FIBT World Championships was 14th in the four-man event at Altenberg in 2008.

He finished tied for ninth in the four-man event at the 2010 Winter Olympics in Vancouver.

References
 

1979 births
Bobsledders at the 2010 Winter Olympics
Italian male bobsledders
Living people
Olympic bobsledders of Italy
Bobsledders of Fiamme Oro
Place of birth missing (living people)